Nevhodný Typ is the seventh album by the Slovak punk rock band Iné Kafe, released on January 1, 2015.

Track listing

Standard Edition

Personnel
 Vratko Rohoň - vocals, guitar, backing vocals
 Roman "Hulo" Hulin - bass, backing vocals
 Jozef "Dodo" Praženec – drums, backing vocals

Guest artists
 Daniel Urbán - bass (solo at Zlý)
 Viliam Bujnovský - keyboard (Pár sráčov bohatých)

References

2015 albums
Iné Kafe albums